Barthélémy Thomas Strafforello (1764-1845) was a French politician. He served as a member of the Chamber of Deputies from 1820 to 1829. He was a Knight of the Legion of Honour.

References

1764 births
1845 deaths
Politicians from Marseille
Members of the Chamber of Deputies of the Bourbon Restoration
Chevaliers of the Légion d'honneur